Chalermchai Sri-on is a Thai politician.  he serves as Minister of Agriculture and Cooperatives in the second cabinet of Prime Minister Prayut Chan-o-cha.

Early life and education 
Chalermchai Sri-on was born on 7 March 1965 in Thap Sakae District, Prachuap Khiri Khan Province. He graduated high school from Phrommanuson School, Phetchaburi Province. Undergraduate from Faculty of Law, Ramkhamhaeng University and master's degree in Art (Policy and Planning) from Krirk University.

Political careers 
Chalermchai started his political careers as a member of the Prachuap Khiri Khan Provincial Council in 1990 - 2000 and as the Chairman of the Prachuap Khiri Khan Provincial Council in 1995 to 1997 and was the first member of the Prachuap Khiri Khan Provincial House of Representatives in 2001 election and subsequent elections in 2005, 2007 and 2011. Chalermchai is the Deputy Leader of the Democrat Party responsible of the central region. Subsequently, in the Cabinet reshuffle of the government of Abhisit Vejjajiva on 6 June 2010, he was appointed Minister of Labor. In the government of Prayut Chan-o-cha, he was appointed Minister of Agriculture and Cooperatives.

Royal decorations 
  Knight Grand Cordon (Special Class) of the Most Exalted Order of the White Elephant 
  Knight Grand Cordon (Special Class) of The Most Noble Order of the Crown of Thailand

References 

Living people
1965 births
Chalermchai Sri-on
Chalermchai Sri-on
Chalermchai Sri-on
Chalermchai Sri-on
Chalermchai Sri-on